Buster may refer to:

People
Buster (surname)
Buster (given name)
Buster (nickname)
Buster Bloodvessel (born 1958), English singer of the ska revival band Bad Manners
Buster Brown (musician) (1911–1976), American blues and R&B singer
Buster Crabbe, Olympic swimmer and actor Clarence Linden Crabbe II (1908–1983)
Edward "Little Buster" Forehand, soul and blues musician
Buster Keaton, American actor, comedian and filmmaker
Buster Larsen, Danish comic actor Axel Landing Larsen (1920–1993)
Buster Poindexter, a pseudonym of singer David Johansen (born 1950)
Prince Buster, Jamaican musician Cecil Bustamente Campbell (1938–2016)
Dolly Buster, film producer and director, actress, author, and former porn star Nora Baumberger (born 1969)

Arts and entertainment

Comics
Buster (comics), a British comic 
Buster (sport comic), a Swedish comic

Fictional characters
 Buster Baxter, frequently identified as "Buster the Bunny", star of Postcards from Buster and originally from the show Arthur
 Buster Blues, in Blues Brothers 2000
 Buster Bluth, from Arrested Development
 Buster Brown, a comic strip character created in 1902, and the children's shoes associated with that character
 Buster Bunny, from Tiny Toon Adventures
 Buster Capp, the eponymous star of the Buster comic, son of Andy and Flo Capp
 Buster Gonad, a comic strip character from the magazine Viz
 Buster Moon, one of the main characters from the Sing franchise
 Buster Kilrain, from the novel The Killer Angels and the movie adaptation Gettysburg (1993)
 GAT-X103 Buster Gundam, from the Mobile Suit Gundam SEED universe
 Buster the Bear, a character from the cartoon Fables of the Green Forest
 Buster the Nanobot, a boss in Ty the Tasmanian Tiger 2: Bush Rescue
 Buster, Andy's dog in the Toy Story franchise
 Buster, antagonist of Lady and the Tramp II: Scamp's Adventure
 Buster, a puppy owned by Darby in My Friends Tigger & Pooh
 Buster, the monkey mascot of Price Busters TV, a shopping channel based in the UK

Film and television
 Buster (film), a film starring Phil Collins
 Buster (MythBusters), the MythBusters crash test dummy

Music
 Buster (band), an English rock band, formed in Wirral, near Liverpool in 1974
 Buster (soundtrack), the soundtrack to the film Buster
 "Buster", the theme song by Nanna Lüders Jensen for the Danish television show Busters verden
 Busters (group), a South Korean pop group

Computing and technology
 Buster, an Amiga custom computer chip
 Buster, a multiservice tactical brevity code signaling an aircraft pilot to use maximum continuous power
 Buster, the codename of version 10 of the Debian Linux operating system

Animals
 Buster (dog) (died 2009) a dog owned by Roy Hattersley, who wrote a book credited to Buster
 Buster (spaniel) (2002–2015), a British military detection dog
 Buster (died 2009), a dog owned by Paul O'Grady that regularly appeared on The Paul O'Grady Show

See also